Gabit Musirepov is a district of North Kazakhstan Region in northern Kazakhstan. The administrative center of the district is the selo of Novoishimskoye. Population:

Name
The district was named after a Soviet Kazakh writer, playwright and author of libretto to Kazakh opera Kyz-Zhibek, Gabit Musirepov

References

Districts of Kazakhstan
North Kazakhstan Region